The European Spatial Development Planning or ESDP-Network seeks to promote education, research and professional training in spatial planning across European countries, in collaboration with many partners in other regions of the world. To this purpose it considers planning as a process and a change agenda.

Presently coordinated by Frank Moulaert at Global Urban Research Unit, Newcastle University, the network coordinates a number of student and staff mobility programmes involving various partner institutions in a number of European countries. The existing structure is a merger of the Spatial Development Planning network established by Louis Albrechts at the University of Leuven, Belgium in 1987 and that built around the European Town planning by Richard Williams at Newcastle University in the 1990s. The overlaps between both networks shows a natural basis for their integration.

Aims and objectives 
The basic aims of the network revolve around the need to promote the Planning practices across Europe, interdisciplinary interactions, and identification of successful planning experiences.

Three kinds of staff and students exchanges are supported under the banner of the network: 
 General ERASMUS programme mobility; 
 Short Intensive Programmes; and, 
 a comprehensive Postgraduate Certificate in European Spatial Development and Planning.

Apart from this the network scholars are also engaged in wider interdisciplinary research through various programmes funded by European Commission and respective national institutions.

The network also holds regular scholarly events that generally address the evolution of planning aspects since the inception of the network.

Participating institutions 
:
 Katholieke Universiteit Leuven, Leuven
:
 University of Lille, Lille
 François Rabelais University, Tours
:
 University of Bremen, Bremen
:
 Harokopio University, Athens
:
 Università degli Studi di Milano-Bicocca, Milan
 Università Mediterranea di Reggio Calabria, Reggio Calabria
 Politecnico di Torino, Turin
 Università di Roma La Sapienza, Rome
 Università degli Studi di Napoli Fredrico-II, Naples
:
 University of Aveiro, Aveiro
:
 Slovenská technická univerzita v Bratislave, Bratislava
:
 University of the Basque Country, Bilbao
:
KTH Royal Institute of Technology, Stockholm
 Blekinge Tekniska Högskola, Blekinge
:
 Middle East Technical University, Ankara
:
 University of Newcastle upon Tyne, Newcastle upon Tyne, England
 Cardiff University, Wales

See also 
 Global Urban Research Unit
 ESPRID

European research networks